Cinderella is a genus of flies in the family Heleomyzidae. There are about six described species in Cinderella.

Species
These six species belong to the genus Cinderella:
C. aczeli Steyskal, 1969 c g
C. hirsuta Hennig, 1969 c g
C. lampra Steyskal, 1949 i c g b
C. macalpinei Hennig, 1969 c g
C. pollinosa Hennig, 1969 c g
C. steyskali Hennig, 1969 c g
Data sources: i = ITIS, c = Catalogue of Life, g = GBIF, b = Bugguide.net

References

Further reading

 

Heleomyzidae
Articles created by Qbugbot
Sphaeroceroidea genera
Taxa named by George C. Steyskal